The 1947 Grand Prix season was the second post-war year for Grand Prix racing. It constituted the first full season of the FIA's Formula One motor racing, though some Grands Prix still used other formulas.  There was no organised championship in 1947, although several of the more prestigious races were recognised as Grandes Épreuves (great trials) by the FIA. Luigi Villoresi proved to be the most successful driver, winning six Grands Prix. Alfa Romeo's cars proved difficult to beat, winning 13 of the season's 32 Grands Prix.

Season review

Grandes Épreuves

Other Grands Prix

Statistics

Grand Prix winners

Drivers

Manufacturers

References

Grand Prix seasons